Trinity Church (1735-1872) was an Episcopal church in Boston, Massachusetts, located on Summer Street. It housed Boston's third Anglican congregation. The Great Fire of 1872 destroyed the church building, and by 1877 the congregation moved into a new building in Back Bay.

History

1728-1827 

When Boston's King's Chapel became overcrowded, some members of the congregation organized a new church beginning in 1728. The newly constructed Trinity Church opened in 1735. The wood building "was 90 feet long, and 60 broad, without any external adornment. It had neither tower nor steeple, nor windows in the lower story of the front. There were 3 entrances in front unprotected by porches. The interior was composed of an arch resting upon Corinthian pillars with handsomely carved and gilded capitals. In the chancel were some paintings, considered very beautiful in their day."

Ministers included Addington Davenport (1740-1746); William Hooper (1747-1767); William Walter (1767-1776); Samuel Parker (1779-1804); John Sylvester John Gardiner (1805-1830).

Parishioners included Peter Faneuil, Charles Apthorp, Philip Dumaresq, William Coffin, Thomas Aston Coffin, Leonard Vassall, Samuel Hale Parker. In 1789 George Washington worshipped at the church.

1828-1872 

George W. Brimmer designed the second Trinity Church building on Summer Street, completed in 1829. One writer described it as a "massive temple of rough-hewn granite and ponderous square front tower" The "Gothic Revival-style church served as a prototype for many of the earliest New England churches in the Gothic Revival style."

Ministers included George Washington Doane (1830-1833); Jonathan Wainwright (1833-1838); Manton Eastburn (1843-1869); Phillips Brooks (1869-1891).

After the fire of 1872 swept through downtown Boston, Trinity Church fell to ruins: "its broken tower and partly crumbled walls presenting the most picturesque ruin of all in that costly conflagration."

By 1877, the congregation moved into its new Trinity Church building in Copley Square.

Ministers
 Addington Davenport (1740–1746)
 William Hooper (1747–1767)
 William Walter (1768–1776)
 Samuel Parker (1779–1804)
 John Sylvester John Gardiner (1805–1830)
 George Washington Doane (1831–1832)
 Jonathan Mayhew Wainwright (1833–1838)
 Manton Eastburn (1842–1868)
 Phillips Brooks (1869–1891)

See also  
 Trinity Church, Boston

References

Image gallery

Further reading 
 John Sylvester John Gardiner. A discourse delivered at Trinity Church, Boston, July 23, 1812 on the day of publick fast in Massachusetts upon the declaration of war against Great-Britain. Boston: Munroe & Francis, 1812.
 John Henry Hopkins. Religion the only safeguard of national prosperity a sermon preached in Trinity Church Boston, December 1, 1831, being the day of annual Thanksgiving. Boston: S.H. Parker, 1831.
 The records of Trinity Church, Boston, 1728-1830. Boston: Colonial Society of Massachusetts, 1980-1982.

External links 

 Boston Public Library. Images of Trinity Church, Boston
 Boston Public Library. Item related to Trinity Church from Gleason's Pictorial
 New York Public Library. Item related to Trinity Church

Former buildings and structures in Boston
18th century in Boston
19th century in Boston
Financial District, Boston
1728 establishments in Massachusetts